Kaempfer's tody-tyrant (Hemitriccus kaempferi) is a rare species of bird in the family Tyrannidae. It is endemic to the Atlantic forest in southeastern Brazil. It was known only from two specimens until the 1990s, when it was finally observed in life. It is protected under Brazilian law and it is on the United States' Endangered Species List.

The eyes are encircled with pale rings.

Specimens of this bird were collected in 1929 and 1950. It was not seen again until 1991.

The bird lives in forested habitat, often near rivers. Pairs often forage together. They build nests several meters up in trees, constructing them with mosses, grasses, and dead leaves. The call is a series of "kwit" notes.

References

External links
BirdLife Species Factsheet.

Hemitriccus
Birds of the Atlantic Forest
Endemic birds of Brazil
Birds described in 1953
Taxa named by John T. Zimmer
Taxonomy articles created by Polbot